The Miss Nicaragua 2002 pageant, was held on March 7, 2002 in Managua, after several weeks of events.  At the conclusion of the final night of competition, Marianela Lacayo from Managua won the title. She represented Nicaragua at Miss Universe 2002 held in Puerto Rico but unplaced and also Miss International 2002 held in Tokyo, Japan where she was a semi-finalist. The rest of the finalists would enter different pageants.

Placements

Special awards

 Miss Photogenic - Chinandega - Silvia Cristina Gonzalez
 Miss Dorian Gray - Madriz - Carmen Cabrera
 Best Hair - Leon - Hazel Calderon
 Most Beautiful Face - Managua - Marianela Lacayo
 Miss Congeniality - Esteli - Yulissa Molina
 Miss Internet - Chinandega - Silvia Cristina Gonzalez (by votes of Global Beauties Webpage)

Official Contestants

Judges
 Leda Sanchez, Vice President of National Tourism Institute
 Magdalena Ponce de Leon, Executive Editor of FEM Magazine
 Maria Lilly Delgado, News Director of Televicentro
 Beatriz Obregón, Miss Nicaragua 1977
 Mario Solano, Regional Manager of Copa Airlines
 Marcio Telleria, MBA from University of Minnesota, Carlson School of Management
 Roxana Waid de Mantica, Executive Producer of Video-Arte Productions S.A

Background Music
 Opening Show, Pablo Antonio Cuadra, "Cantar de Granada y el Mar"
 Swimsuit Competition, Kylie Minogue, "Can't Get You Out of My Head"
 Evening Gown Competition, Ronald Hernandez & Jeffrey Ruben, "Cara al Sol" and "Procuro Olvidarte" (Instrumental)

Special Guests
 Ballet Heriberto Mercado, "El Gitano Anton"
 Cristyana Somarriba, "Abrazame"
 Macolla, "Siempre te Amare"

References

Miss Nicaragua
2002 in Nicaragua
2002 beauty pageants